Editha von Rahden (1823-1885) was a Baltic-German philanthropist in the Russian Empire.

She was born to the courtier Ferdinand von Rahden and Wilhelmine von Keyserling on 20 December 1823. She was a lady-in-waiting to Grand Duchess Helena Pawlovna and later to Empress Maria Fedorovna. In Russia, she hosted a literary salon and among her guests were the poet Leskov, Carl Ferdinand Walter, Georg Berkholz, Carmen Sylva, and Cardinal Antonelli.

In the court of Helena Pawlovna, the "witty" Editha was known for her literacy and ability to summarize current literature, according to Bunnett.Fraulein von Rahden, the favourite lady of the Court, was not to be surpassed in the art of making short compendiums of the bulkiest works, and for years German scholars joined this most unusual woman in her task, finding plenty to do in sifting the material with which the indefatigable royal reader was supplied. During her employment with Helene Pavlovna, she became a member of her charitable nursing organisation in 1854. After this, she became engaged in several charitable organisations with a focus on medical care and female education. She assisted the Empress Maria in several of her projects.

She died 9 October 1823 in St. Petersburg, Russia.

References

1823 births
1885 deaths
19th-century Latvian people
Baltic German people from the Russian Empire
Philanthropists from the Russian Empire
Ladies-in-waiting from the Russian Empire
Salon holders from the Russian Empire
19th-century philanthropists